Souleymane Sylla may refer to:
 Souleymane Sylla (footballer)
 Souleymane Sylla (actor)